Rosebrook is a locality in southwest Victoria, Australia.

Traditional ownership
The formally recognised traditional owners for the area in which Rosebrook sits are the Eastern Maar people, who are represented by the Eastern Maar Aboriginal Corporation (EMAC).

References

External links

Towns in Victoria (Australia)